The 2010 FIA WTCC Race of the Czech Republic (formally the 2010 FIA WTCC Monroe Race of the Czech Republic) was the seventh round of the 2010 World Touring Car Championship season and the fifth running of the Race of the Czech Republic. It was held at the Masaryk Circuit near Brno, Czech Republic on 1 August 2010. The two races were won by Robert Huff of Chevrolet RML and Andy Priaulx of BMW Team RBM.

Background
Coming into the round, Yvan Muller was leading the drivers' championship and Sergio Hernández was leading the Yokohama Independents' Trophy.

After missing the previous round at Brands Hatch for personal reason, Andrei Romanov returned to Liqui Moly Team Engstler. Fabio Fabiani returned to Scuderia Proteam Motorsport having last raced for the team at the Race of Italy.

Changes were made to the Independents' Trophy after the Race of UK. As well as the usual independents' points systems, additional points are awarded  for each point scored in the main drivers' championship. After Colin Turkington's success at Brands Hatch, the number of additional points was limited to twelve to prevent a repeat of this.

Report

Free practice
Chevrolet's Alain Menu set the pace in free practice one with SR-Sport's Gabriele Tarquini second and BMW driver Turkington third. Yokohama Trophy leader Hernández was tenth while overall championship leader Muller was sixteenth.

Turkington led free practice two, nearly half a second quicker than Muller. The session was brought to an early close when Tiago Monteiro beached his SEAT León TDI in a gravel trap.

Qualifying
Huff claimed his first pole position of the season in qualifying, lining up alongside Tarquini on the front row. Huff had been quickest in Q1, the surprise drop–outs from the first segment being the works BMW of Priaulx and SR–Sport driver Monteiro. Their efforts were spoilt by a red flag brought out by Fabiani who had beached his car in a gravel trap, the stoppage meant neither driver was able to set a time fast enough to progress through to the top ten shoot–out.

After Q2, Huff and Tarquini shared the front row with Turkington and Farfus behind. Huff's team mate Menu was fifth alongside Norbert Michelisz and Tom Coronel shared the fourth row with the third factory Chevrolet car of Muller. Jordi Gené and Michel Nykjær completed the top ten.

After lining up third in qualifying, Turkington was stripped of independent status and would now only be eligible for the main championship.

Warm-Up
Priaulx was quickest in the warm–up prior to the first race on Sunday morning. The fastest independent driver was Darryl O'Young in sixth while pole sitter Huff was eighth.

Race One
Huff depended from Tarquini at the rolling start and kept his lead into the first corner, escaping a first lap crash which caught out several of their rivals. Gené and Coronel retired while Priaulx, Kristian Poulsen and Fredy Barth continued with minor damage. The safety car was brought out while the wreckage was cleared, and on the restart Turkington and Michelisz clashed with the eBay Motors driver losing control and taking out championship leader Muller. Turkington continued while Michelisz retired and Muller returned to the pits for repairs. By now the front four of Huff, Tarquini, Menu and Augusto Farfus had broken away from the rest of the field led by Turkington although Priaulx eventually passed him on the last lap to finish fifth. Huff took the win with Tarquini second and Menu third. Poulsen was the independent winner by finishing eighth after a 30–second penalty was given to O'Young for causing a collision.

Race Two
O'Young started on pole position for race two although he was passed at the start by Priaulx from fourth on the grid. Turkington had leapt up from third to first at the start and at the end of the first lap Turkington lead Priaulx. Priaulx passed Turkington on the second lap while Tarquini, Menu and Huff closed in. On lap four Tarquini overshot the corner and dropped to fourth place behind Menu. Tarquini stopped two laps from the end with an injector failure, promoting Huff into fourth place. Priaulx took the win ahead of Turkington with Menu completing the podium for the second race in a row. O'Young was the independent winner while Muller finished twelfth, scoring no points over the course of the weekend.

Results

Qualifying

Race 1

Bold denotes Fastest lap.

 — O'Young originally finished in eighth position, but was given a 30-second penalty for causing a collision during the race.

Race 2

Bold denotes Fastest lap.

 — Bennani originally finished in 15th position, but was given a 30-second penalty for causing a collision during the race.

Standings after the event

Drivers' Championship standings

Yokohama Independents' Trophy standings

Manufacturers' Championship standings

 Note: Only the top five positions are included for both sets of drivers' standings.

References

Results Booklet PDF at MST Systems

External links
World Touring Car Championship official website

Czech Republic
FIA WTCC Race of the Czech Republic